Piero Bernocchi (13 September 1947) is an Italian teacher, trade union officer and politician. He was a principal founder of COBAS, a workerist organization.

Biography 
Piero Bernocchi was born 13 September 1947, in Foligno. He participated as a protagonist in the Italian social movements of the 1960s and the 1970s, since the 1968 movement in which he was part of the Coordination team of the Departments of Science, of the Workers' Committee and as leader of the movement at the Faculty of Engineering, University of Rome.

Among the main representatives of the Movement of 1977, he was the director of a radio station Radio Città Futura, the first free Italian radio, which was the voice of the Italian movement between 1979 and 1985.

He is a representative of the 'alternative' trade unionism in Italy, although his activity goes beyond trade unionism. This is because his organization, the Cobas, represents a unique organization that is involved in political, trade unionist, social and cultural initiatives and it rejects any form of separation among them.

He contributed to the creation of the Cobas school unit, which started in 1987. He is still the spokesman of the Cobas school unit and of the Cobas Confederation. The latter includes the following units: School, Health, Public sector and Private sector.

He played a main role in the organization of the World and European Social Forum against the liberal globalization movement starting from the first edition of the World Social Forum (WSF) in Porto Alegre in 2001 and of the European Social Forum (ESF) in Florence in 2002. He is also among the leaders of the 'noglobal' Italian movement, which was born in Genoa during the anti-G8 days in July 2001.

Bibliography 

He has written, among other essays and articles, the following books:
Le riforme in URSS (contenente anche saggi di Birman, Kantorovic, Leontev, Novozhilov, Omarov), La Salamandra, 1977
Movimento settantasette, storia di una lotta, [con E. Compagnoni, P. D'Aversa, R.Striano], Rosemberg & Sellier, 1979
Capire Danzica Edizioni Quotidiano dei Lavoratori, 1980
Oltre il muro di Berlino. Le ragioni della rivolta in Germania Est, Massari, 1990
Dal sindacato ai Cobas. Massari, 1993
Dal '77 in poi, Massari, 1997
Per una critica del '68. Massari, 1998
Scuola-azienda e istruzione-merce, AA.VV., Ed. Cesp-Cobas, 2000
Vecchi e nuovi saperi, AA.VV., Ed. Cesp-Cobas, 2001
"Un altro mondo in costruzione" (con AA.VV.), Baldini &Castoldi, 2002
Nel cuore delle lotte Edizioni Colibrì, 2004.
In movimento (Scritti 2000–2008), Massari, 2008
Vogliamo un altro mondo. Datanews, 2008
Benicomunismo, Massari Editore, 2012
Oltre il capitalismo (Discutendo di benicomunismo per un'altra società), Massari editore, 2015

References 

Living people
Italian trade unionists
Italian male writers
Year of birth missing (living people)